Dearham Bridge was a railway station on the Maryport and Carlisle Railway (M&CR) serving the village and rural district of Dearham in Cumberland (now in Cumbria), England. The station was opened by the M&CR in 1842 as Dearham, but was renamed Dearham Bridge in 1867 when the M&CR opened a station in the village of Dearham, to which it gave that name. Dearham Bridge station lay in the Parish of Crosscanonby.

History 
Dearham Bridge station was opened by the Maryport & Carlisle Railway (M&CR) in 1840. At grouping in 1923 the M&CR became a part of the London, Midland and Scottish Railway. It was one of several lightly used intermediate stations on this route to be closed (in 1950) by the British Transport Commission in the years immediately after the nationalisation of the UK railway network.  No trace of the station now remains, but the main Carlisle-Maryport line (completed in 1845) remains open and forms part of the Cumbrian Coast Line between Carlisle and Barrow in Furness. Branch lines here served Lowther Pit, Lonsdale Pit, Nelson Pit on Broughton Moor, Bertha Pit, etc.

In the 19th century coal was brought down a tramway from pits on Broughton Moor and transferred to M&CR trains at the station.

The station is known for a haunting related to a man who threw his new-born child under a train here, killing the infant. Now, as a train is about to enter the tunnel, the child can occasionally be heard screaming before being hit. The father was hanged for the crime.

The Birkby Fire Brick Works and Colliery was nearby, worked by Messrs. Steele and Beveridge, of Maryport; it gave employment to about forty people.

See also

 Maryport & Carlisle Railway
 Whitehaven, Cleator and Egremont Railway
 Cleator and Workington Junction Railway
 Cockermouth & Workington Railway
 Dearham railway station

References

Sources
 
 
 
 

Further reading

External links
 The station on an Edwardian OS map, via National Library of Scotland
 The station on the coast line, with mileages, via Railway Codes
 The station on an old O.S. Map via npemaps

Disused railway stations in Cumbria
Former Maryport and Carlisle Railway stations
Railway stations in Great Britain opened in 1842
Railway stations in Great Britain closed in 1950
1842 establishments in England
Railway stations in Cumbria
Crosscanonby